In statistics, the g-prior is an objective prior for the regression coefficients of a multiple regression. It was introduced by Arnold Zellner.
It is a key tool in Bayes and empirical Bayes variable selection.

Definition

The multiple regression model is formulated as

where g is a positive scalar parameter.

Posterior distribution of beta 

where  and

Clearly, as g →∞, the posterior mean converges to the maximum likelihood estimator.

Selection of g

A variety of methods have been proposed, including Bayes and empirical Bayes estimators.<ref

References

Bayesian statistics
Regression analysis